Glen Echo Historic District may refer to:

Glen Echo Historic District (Normandy and Glen Echo Park, Missouri), listed on the National Register of Historic Places in St. Louis County, Missouri
Glen Echo Historic District (Columbus, Ohio), listed on the National Register of Historic Places in Franklin County, Ohio

See also
Glen Echo (disambiguation)